Mehdi Soltan (also Romanized as Mehdī Solṭān; also known as Mehdīābād and Shahr-e Kharāb) is a village in Bizaki Rural District, Golbajar District, Chenaran County, Razavi Khorasan Province, Iran. At the 2006 census, its population was 13, in 4 families.

References 

Populated places in Chenaran County